The 2022–23 season is the 143rd competitive association football season in England. The season began in July 2022 due to the 2022 FIFA World Cup taking place from 20 November to 18 December 2022, the first time that an entire football season commenced a month earlier than normal since the 1945–46 season.

National teams

England national football team

Results and fixtures

Friendlies

UEFA Nations League

Group 3

FIFA World Cup

Group B

Knockout stage

UEFA Euro 2024 qualifying

Group C

England women's national football team

Results and fixtures

Friendlies

UEFA Women's Euro

Group A

Knockout stage 

Final

2023 FIFA Women's World Cup qualification

Group D

2023 Arnold Clark Cup

2023 Women's Finalissima

UEFA competitions

UEFA Champions League

Group stage

Group A

Group D

Group E

Group G

Knockout phase

Round of 16 

|}

Quarter-finals

|}

UEFA Europa League

Group stage

Group A

Group E

Knockout stage

Knockout-round play-offs 

|}

Round of 16 

|}

Quarter-finals

|}

UEFA Europa Conference League

Qualifying phase and play-off round

Play-off round 

|}

Group stage

Group B

Knockout stage

Knockout-round play-offs

Round of 16

|}

Quarter-finals

|}

UEFA Youth League

UEFA Champions League Path

Group stage

Group A

Group D

Group E

Group G

Knockout phase

Play-offs

Round of 16

|}

Quarter-finals

|}

UEFA Women's Champions League

Qualifying rounds

Round 1

Semi-finals

Final

Round 2 

|}

Group stage

Group A

Group C

Knockout phase

Quarter-finals

|}

Men's football

Premier League

Championship

League One

League Two

National League

North

South

Cup competitions

FA Cup

EFL Cup

Final

Community Shield

EFL Trophy

Final

FA Trophy

Women's football

FA Women's Super League

FA Women's Championship

FA Women's National League

Cup competitions

Women's FA Cup

Women's FA Cup

Final

FA Women's League Cup

Final

Women's FA Community Shield

Managerial changes 
This is a list of changes of managers within English league football:

Deaths 

 3 June 2022: Frank Clarke, 79, Shrewsbury Town, Queens Park Rangers, Ipswich Town and Carlisle United forward.
 3 June 2022: Geoff Hunter, 62, Crewe Alexandra, Port Vale and Wrexham midfielder.
 4 June 2022: Peter Neale, 88, Oldham Athletic, Scunthorpe United and Chesterfield defender.
 9 June 2022: Billy Bingham, 90, Northern Ireland, Sunderland, Luton Town, Everton and Port Vale outside right, who also managed Southport, Plymouth Argyle, Everton and Mansfield Town.
 9 June 2022: Ron Farmer, 86, Coventry City, Nottingham Forest and Notts County midfielder.
 10 June 2022: Bobby Hope, 78, Scotland, West Bromwich Albion, Birmingham City and Sheffield Wednesday inside forward.
 12 June 2022: Alex Russell, 78, Southport, Blackburn Rovers and  Tranmere Rovers midfielder.
 19 June 2022: Colin Grainger, 89, England, Wrexham, Sheffield United, Sunderland, Leeds United, Port Vale and Doncaster Rovers outside left.
 c. 20 June 2022: Bruce Crawford, 83, Blackpool and Tranmere Rovers wing half.
 22 June 2022: Graham Tutt, 65, Charlton Athletic goalkeeper.
 24 June 2022: Martyn Forrest, 43, Bury midfielder.
 27 June 2022: Albert Derrick, 82, Newport County inside forward.
 1 July 2022: Gary Pearson, 45, Darlington defender/midfielder.
 2 July 2022: Andy Goram, 58, Scotland, Oldham Athletic, Notts County, Sheffield United, Manchester United and Coventry City goalkeeper.
 3 July 2022: Dave Shearer, 63, Middlesbrough, Grimsby Town, Gillingham, AFC Bournemouth, Scunthorpe United and Darlington striker.
 4 July 2022: Clive Middlemass, 77, Workington defender, who also managed Carlisle United and Darlington.
 5 July 2022: Len Casey MBE, 91, Chelsea and Plymouth Argyle wing half.
 8 July 2022: Henry Mowbray, 75, Blackpool and Bolton Wanderers defender.
 8 July 2022: Phil Walker, 67, Millwall and Charlton Athletic midfielder.
 9 July 2022: Davie Robb, 74, Scotland and Norwich City forward.
 10 July 2022: Ken Armstrong, 63, Southampton and Birmingham City defender.
 13 July 2022: Stuart Chapman, 71, Port Vale midfielder.
 19 July 2022: Jack Parry, 90, Derby County inside forward.
 24 July 2022: Neil Hague, 72, Rotherham United, Plymouth Argyle, AFC Bournemouth, Huddersfield Town and Darlington defender.
 28 July 2022: Terry Gulliver, 77, AFC Bournemouth right back
 28 July 2022: Terry Neill, 80, Northern Ireland, Arsenal and Hull City defender, who also managed Hull City, Northern Ireland, Tottenham Hotspur and Arsenal.
 1 August 2022: John Hughes, 79, Scotland, Crystal Palace and Sunderland outside left/striker.
 3 August 2022: Andrejs Rubins, 43, Latvia and Crystal Palace midfielder.
 c. 3 August 2022: Adrian Thorne, 83, Brighton & Hove Albion, Plymouth Argyle, Exeter City and Leyton Orient winger.
 5 August 2022: Aled Owen, 88, Tottenham Hotspur, Ipswich Town and Wrexham winger.
 9 August 2022: Mick Jones, 75, Notts County and Peterborough United defender, who also managed Mansfield Town, Halifax Town, Peterborough United and Plymouth Argyle.
 10 August 2022: Billy Legg, 74, Huddersfield Town full back.
 11 August 2022: Pat Liney, 86, Bradford City goalkeeper.
 15 August 2022: Lenny Johnrose, 52, Blackburn Rovers, Hartlepool United, Bury, Burnley and Swansea City midfielder.
 21 August 2022: David Armstrong, 67, England, Middlesbrough, Southampton and AFC Bournemouth midfielder.
 c. 24 August 2022: Billy Hodgson, 87, Sheffield United, Leicester City, Derby County, Rotherham United and York City inside forward/winger.
 c. 25 August 2022: Dave Rudge, 74, Aston Villa, Hereford United and Torquay United midfielder.
 27 August 2022: Tony Nelson, 92, Newport County and AFC Bournemouth defender.
 28 August 2022: Sammy Chung, 90, Reading, Norwich City and Watford striker, who also managed Wolverhampton Wanderers and Doncaster Rovers.
 c. 29 August 2022: Vince McNeice, 83, Watford defender.
 c. 30 August 2022: Tommy Carpenter, 97, Watford goalkeeper.
 30 August 2022: Michael Slocombe, 81, Bristol Rovers defender.
 31 August 2022: Bob Wesson, 82, Coventry City and Walsall goalkeeper.
 8 September 2022: Dave Smith, 88, Burnley, Brighton & Hove Albion and Bristol City defender, who also managed Mansfield Town, Southend United, Plymouth Argyle and Torquay United.
 13 September 2022: Fred Callaghan, 77, Fulham defender, who also managed Brentford.
 21 September 2022: Jimmy Elder, 94, Portsmouth and Colchester United wing half.
 25 September 2022: Roy MacLaren, 92, Bury and Sheffield Wednesday goalkeeper.
 8 October 2022: John Duncan, 73, Tottenham Hotspur, Derby County and Scunthorpe United forward, who also managed Scunthorpe United, Hartlepool United, Chesterfield and Ipswich Town.
 9 October 2022: Kevin Thomas, 78, Blackpool, Tranmere Rovers, Oxford United and Southport goalkeeper.
 10 October 2022: Keith Eddy, 77, Barrow, Watford and Sheffield United midfielder.
 2 November 2022: Ronnie Radford, 79, Newport County and Hereford United midfielder.
 7 November 2022: Eamonn Darcy, 89, Oldham Athletic goalkeeper.
 10 November 2022: Billy Russell, 87, Sheffield United, Bolton Wanderers and Rochdale inside/outside forward.
 12 November 2022: John Connaughton, 73, Manchester United, Sheffield United, Port Vale and Altrincham goalkeeper.
 18 November 2022: Francis Joseph, 62, Wimbledon, Brentford, Reading, Sheffield United, Gillingham, Crewe Alexandra and Fulham forward.
 20 November 2022: Frank Rankmore, 83, Wales, Cardiff City, Peterborough United and Northampton Town defender.
 23 November 2022: David Johnson, 71, England, Everton, Ipswich Town, Liverpool, Manchester City and Preston North End striker.
 24 November 2022: Neil Robinson, 65, Everton, Swansea City, Grimsby Town and Darlington defender/midfielder.
 27 November 2022: Mick Meagan, 88, Republic of Ireland, Everton, Huddersfield Town and Halifax Town defender.
 27 November 2022: Maurice Norman, 88, England, Norwich City and Tottenham Hotspur defender.
 8 December 2022: Tony Allen, 83, England, Stoke City and Bury defender.
 14 December 2022: Alex Duchart, 89, Southend United winger.
 23 December 2022: George Cohen , 83, England World Cup winner and Fulham defender.
 24 December 2022: Keith Sanderson, 82, Plymouth Argyle and Queens Park Rangers midfielder.
 29 December 2022: John Jackson, 80, Crystal Palace, Leyton Orient, Millwall, Ipswich Town and Hereford United goalkeeper.
 29 December 2022: Jackie Overfield, 90, Leeds United, Sunderland, Peterborough United and Bradford City winger.
 c. 30 December 2022: Derek Lampe, 85, Fulham defender.
 6 January 2023: Gianluca Vialli, 58, Italy and Chelsea striker, who also managed Chelsea and Watford.
 8 January 2023: Barry Lines, 80, Northampton Town outside left.
 19 January 2023: Peter Thomas, 78, Republic of Ireland and Coventry City goalkeeper.
 19 January 2023: Anton Walkes, 25, Tottenham Hotspur and Portsmouth defender and midfielder.
 24 January 2023: Patrizio Billio, 48, Crystal Palace midfielder.
 6 February 2023: Peter Allen, 76, Leyton Orient and Millwall midfielder, who is Orient's record appearance holder.
 c. 6 February 2023: Christian Atsu, 31, Ghana, Chelsea, Everton, AFC Bournemouth and Newcastle United winger.
 7 February 2023: Roy Wood, 92, Leeds United goalkeeper.
 12 February 2023: Tony Lee, 75, Bradford City and Darlington winger.
 16 February 2023: Kevin Bird, 70, Mansfield Town and Huddersfield Town defender.
 16 February 2023: Colin Dobson, 82, Sheffield Wednesday, Huddersfield Town and Bristol Rovers inside forward.
 27 February 2023: Sammy Winston, 44, Leyton Orient striker.
 8 March 2023: Martin Gorry, 68, Barnsley, Newcastle United and Hartlepool United left back.
 9 March 2023: Alan Jones, 77, Swansea City, Hereford United and Southport defender.
 c. 16 March 2023: Don Megson, 86, Sheffield Wednesday and Bristol Rovers defender, who also managed Bristol Rovers and AFC Bournemouth.

Retirements 
 1 June 2022: Sebastian Prödl, 34, former Austria and Watford defender.
 4 June 2022: Carlos Tevez, 38, former Argentina, West Ham United, Manchester United and Manchester City forward.
 14 June 2022: Arturo Lupoli, 35, former Arsenal, Derby County, Norwich City and Sheffield United forward.
 17 June 2022: Jason Pearce, 34, former AFC Bournemouth, Portsmouth, Leeds United, Wigan Athletic and Charlton Athletic defender.
 18 June 2022: Paul Caddis, 34, former Scotland, Swindon Town, Birmingham City, Bury, Blackburn Rovers and Bradford City defender.
 19 June 2022: Aleksandar Kolarov, 36, former Serbia and Manchester City defender.
 22 June 2022: Daryl Janmaat, 32, former Netherlands, Newcastle United and Watford right back.
 22 June 2022: Jamie Ness, 31, former Stoke City, Scunthorpe United and Plymouth Argyle midfielder.
 8 July 2022: Giles Coke, 36, former Mansfield Town, Northampton Town, Sheffield Wednesday, Ipswich Town, Chesterfield, Oldham Athletic and Grimsby Town midfielder.
 8 July 2022: Jack Wilshere, 30, former England, Arsenal, Bolton Wanderers, AFC Bournemouth and West Ham United midfielder.
 12 July 2022: Chris Burke, 38, former Scotland, Cardiff City, Birmingham City and Nottingham Forest winger.
 19 July 2022: Tommy Oar, 30, former Australia and Ipswich Town midfielder.
 20 July 2022: James Meredith, 34, former Australia, Cambridge United, Chesterfield, Shrewsbury Town, Telford, York City, Bradford City and Millwall defender.
 10 August 2022: Ben Watson, 37, former Crystal Palace, Wigan Athletic, Watford, Nottingham Forest and Charlton Athletic midfielder.
 16 August 2022: Nacho Monreal, 36, former Spain and Arsenal defender.
 26 August 2022: Adam El-Abd, 37, former Egypt, Brighton & Hove Albion, Bristol City, Shrewsbury Town, Wycombe Wanderers and Stevenage defender.
 29 August 2022: Nathan Baker, 31, former Aston Villa and Bristol City defender.
 3 September 2022: Craig Bryson, 35, former Scotland and Derby County midfielder.
 9 September 2022: Davide Santon, 31, former Italy and Newcastle United defender.
 12 September 2022: Matty Blair, 33, former York City, Fleetwood Town, Mansfield Town, Doncaster Rovers and Cheltenham Town defender.
 15 September 2022: Ben Foster, 39, former England, Manchester United, Birmingham City, West Bromwich Albion and Watford goalkeeper.
 21 September 2022: Charlie Adam, 36, former Scotland, Blackpool, Liverpool, Stoke City and Reading midfielder.
 23 September 2022: Lewis Macleod, 28, former Brentford, Wigan Athletic and Plymouth Argyle midfielder.
 25 September 2022: Lee Wallace, 35, former Scotland and Queens Park Rangers defender.
 27 September 2022: Fabian Delph, 32, former England, Leeds United, Aston Villa, Manchester City and Everton midfielder.
 27 September 2022: John Obi Mikel, 35, former Nigeria, Chelsea, Middlesbrough and Stoke City midfielder.
 28 September 2022: Ramires, 35, former Brazil and Chelsea midfielder.
 5 October 2022: Lee Tomlin, 33, former Peterborough United, Middlesbrough, AFC Bournemouth, Bristol City, Cardiff City, Walsall and Doncaster Rovers midfielder.
 7 October 2022: Jake Howells, 31, former Luton Town defender/midfielder.
 9 October 2022: Jacques Maghoma, 34, former DR Congo, Burton Albion, Sheffield Wednesday and Birmingham City midfielder.
 10 October 2022: Enock Mwepu, 24, former Zambia and Brighton & Hove Albion midfielder.
 13 October 2022: Jota, 31, former Brentford, Birmingham City and Aston Villa midfielder.
 17 October 2022: Gonzalo Higuaín, 35, former Argentina and Chelsea forward.
 18 October 2022, Jon Flanagan, 29, former England, Liverpool, Burnley and Bolton Wanderers defender.
 19 October 2022, Anthony Pilkington, 34, former Republic of Ireland, Blackburn Rovers, Stockport County, Huddersfield Town, Norwich City, Cardiff City, Wigan Athletic and Fleetwood Town midfielder.
 23 October 2022, Ben Turner, 34, former Coventry City, Peterborough United, Oldham Athletic, Cardiff City, Burton Albion and Mansfield Town defender.
 28 October 2022: Roman Pavlyuchenko, 40, former Russia and Tottenham Hotspur striker.
 6 November 2022: Sebastian Larsson, 37, former Sweden, Arsenal, Birmingham City, Sunderland and Hull City midfielder.
 6 November 2022: Adam Hammill, 34, former Liverpool, Southampton, Blackpool, Barnsley, Wolverhampton Wanderers, Middlesbrough, Huddersfield Town, Rotherham United and Scunthorpe United midfielder.
 7 November 2022: Neil Taylor, 33, former Wales, Great Britain, Wrexham, Swansea City, Aston Villa and Middlesbrough defender.
 8 November 2022: Gerard Piqué, 35, former Spain and Manchester United defender.
 11 November 2022: Anders Lindegaard, 38, former Denmark, Manchester United, West Bromwich Albion, Preston North End and Burnley goalkeeper.
 15 November 2022: Aaron Lennon, 35, former England,  Leeds United,  Tottenham Hotspur, Everton and Burnley winger.
 16 November 2022: Gary Cahill, 36, former England, Aston Villa, Bolton Wanderers, Chelsea, Crystal Palace and AFC Bournemouth defender.
 29 November 2022: Harry Middleton, 27, former Doncaster Rovers and Port Vale midfielder.
 2 January 2023: Harry Forrester, 32, former Brentford and Doncaster Rovers midfielder.
 6 January 2023: Tyrell Belford, 28, former Swindon Town goalkeeper.
 7 January 2023: Brian Murphy, 39, former Swansea City, Ipswich Town, Queens Park Rangers, Portsmouth and Cardiff City goalkeeper.
 8 January 2023: Craig Mackail-Smith, 38, former Scotland, Peterborough United, Brighton & Hove Albion, Luton Town and Wycombe Wanderers striker.
 9 January 2023: Gareth Bale , 33, former Wales, Southampton and Tottenham Hotspur winger, who holds the record for most caps and goals for his country.
 23 January 2023: Jem Karacan, 33, former Reading, Bolton Wanderers, Millwall, Scunthorpe United, and Radcliffe midfielder.
 8 February 2023: Jeff Hughes, 37, former Northern Ireland, Lincoln City, Crystal Palace, Peterborough United, Bristol Rovers, Notts County, Fleetwood Town, Cambridge United and Tranmere Rovers midfielder.
 14 February 2023: Alfie Mawson, 29, former Wycombe Wanderers, Barnsley, Swansea City, Fulham and Bristol City defender.
 14 February 2023: Nicky Hunt, 39, former Bolton Wanderers, Birmingham City, Derby County, Bristol City, Preston North End, Rotherham United, Accrington Stanley, Mansfield Town, Leyton Orient, Notts County, Crewe Alexandra, Darlington, and Ashton United defender.
 22 February 2023: Olly Lee, 31, former Dagenham & Redbridge, Gillingham, Barnet, Birmingham City, Plymouth Argyle and Luton Town midfielder.
 17 March 2023: Lucas Leiva, 36, former Brazil and Liverpool midfielder.

Diary of the season 
 31 August 2022: The first month of the Premier League season ends with Arsenal top of the table with the only 100% record in the division, 2 points ahead of Manchester City. Tottenham Hotspur, Brighton & Hove Albion, Liverpool, Leeds United and Fulham complete the top seven. Leicester City finish August bottom of the league, albeit with a game in hand (against Manchester United). Wolverhampton Wanderers (18th) and Aston Villa complete the relegation zone, with Everton evading the bottom three on goals scored. Sheffield United lead the Championship at the end of the month, ahead of the three sides relegated from the Premier League last season – Norwich City, Burnley, and Watford. Blackburn Rovers and Reading complete the top six. Coventry City prop up the Championship, but have three games in hand over most of the rest of the table due to three home games being postponed due to an unsafe playing pitch. One of those is against Huddersfield Town, who stand in 23rd; Birmingham City are 22nd.
 30 September 2022: At the end of a month disrupted by the international break and the recent passing of Queen Elizabeth II, Arsenal remain top of the Premier League, a point ahead of Manchester City and Spurs. Brighton, Manchester United, Fulham, and Chelsea round out the top seven. Leicester remain bottom of the Premier League as only one of three teams in the Football League yet to win in the league, joined in the relegation zone by West Ham United (18th) and Nottingham Forest. Sheffield United continue to lead the Championship, 3 points ahead of Norwich. Reading, Burnley, Luton Town (who have played a game more than their promotion rivals), and Sunderland (ahead of Queens Park Rangers and Blackburn on goal difference) make up the play-off places. Coventry City, the second of three winless teams (the third being fourth-tier Hartlepool United), remain bottom with their three games in hand. Huddersfield Town also remain in 23rd. Middlesbrough are 22nd, behind West Bromwich Albion on goal difference.
 31 October 2022: Arsenal remain top of the Premier League at the end of October, 2 points ahead of Manchester City. Spurs and Newcastle United hold the other 2 Champions League spots, with Manchester United, Chelsea and Fulham finishing the month in the top seven. Leicester have ended their winless streak but finish October in 18th, forcing Nottingham Forest down to 20th; West Ham have escaped the relegation zone at the expense of Wolves. Burnley have climbed to top of the Championship, 2 points ahead of Lancastrian rivals Blackburn. The play-off zone is completely changed from the end of September, and now consists of QPR, Sheffield United, Watford and Swansea. Coventry have escaped the relegation zone, and now West Brom are now bottom of the league, 4 points behind Huddersfield. Middlesbrough have escaped 22nd at the expense of Wigan Athletic.
 30 November 2022: A month with a football schedule ended early by the FIFA World Cup in Qatar finishes with Arsenal having increased their lead over Manchester City at the Premier League summit to 5 points. Newcastle have jumped ahead of Spurs, as Liverpool and Brighton have done to Chelsea and Fulham; Manchester United remain fifth. Wolves end the month bottom of the league and facing the ignomity of being bottom at Christmas. Nottingham Forest are now 18th, with the Midlands clubs sandwiching Southampton in the bottom three. Burnley remain top of the Championship, 3 points ahead of Sheffield United, who have swapped positions with Blackburn. Watford climb to fourth, Norwich return to the play-off zone to stand in fifth, and Coventry complete a spectacular 2 month streak of good form to finish November in sixth. West Brom have enjoyed a similar run to finish November out of the bottom three, though there has been no such turnaround for Huddersfield or Wigan, who are now joined in the relegation zone by Blackpool.
 31 December 2022: 2023 arrives with Arsenal now 7 points clear of Manchester City in first. Newcastle remain third, Manchester United have climbed above Spurs to fourth, Liverpool remain sixth, and Fulham completes the top seven. Wolves, Nottingham Forest and Southampton remain in the relegation zone, although Wolves have climbed to 18th. Burnley remain 3 points ahead of Sheffield United in the Championship title race. The Yorkshire club have opened up an 11-point gap over third-placed Blackburn, greater than the point difference between sixth and 21st in the Championship. Sunderland and Watford are tied on 37 points in fourth and fifth, and Middlesbrough claim the coveted sixth position ahead of Norwich, Luton, Millwall and Reading on goal difference. With over half the season played and the aforementioned narrow margins, the play-off chase continues to offer intrigue, with even bottom three clubs Huddersfield, Blackpool, and Wigan only a few matches away from transforming themselves into play-off contenders.
 31 January 2023: Arsenal's lead has been whittled down by Manchester City to 5 points at the end of January, though Arsenal have a game in hand. The top seven is unchanged from the end of December, except for Brighton replacing Liverpool in sixth place. Southampton remain bottom of the league, with Bournemouth (18th) and Everton failing into the bottom three. In the Championship, Burnley's lead over Sheffield United has increased to 5, while Sheffield United's lead over third place (now held by Middlesbrough) has increased to 12. Luton, Watford, and Blackburn complete the top six, but with only 6 points between 6th and 16th the race for the top 6 is far from settled. Although Huddersfield, Blackpool, and Wigan remain in the Championship relegation zone, all 3 have at least one game in hand over 21st-placed Cardiff City.
 28 February 2023: February ends with Arsenal's lead over Manchester City down to 2 points, though Arsenal still have a game in hand. Poor form has seen Newcastle allow Manchester United and Tottenham to leapfrog them out of the Champions League places and knock them down to fifth. Fulham have climbed to sixth, and Liverpool have rejoined the top seven. The relegation zone is unchanged, except for Everton and Bournemouth swapping positions. Burnley's lead in the Championship has grown to 12 points (albeit having played a game more than Sheffield United) - with 19 points between them and third-placed Middlesbrough, it appears to be only a matter of time before the Lancastrian club confirm an immediate return to the Premier League. Blackburn and Luton finish February exchanging their previous end-of-month positions, with Millwall taking fifth. The Championship relegation zone is unchanged from the end of January.

Notes

References 

 
2022 sport-related lists
2023 sport-related lists